This was the first edition of the event.

Antonio Muñoz and Manuel Orantes won the title, defeating Jürgen Fassbender and Hans-Jürgen Pohmann 2–6, 6–4, 7–6, 6–2 in the final.

Seeds

  Juan Gisbert Sr. /  Ilie Năstase (semifinals)
  Jürgen Fassbender /  Hans-Jürgen Pohmann (final)
  Paolo Bertolucci /  Adriano Panatta (semifinals)
  Antonio Muñoz /  Manuel Orantes (champions)

Draw

Draw

External links
Draw

1974 Grand Prix (tennis)
1974 BMW Open